Barber is an unincorporated community and census-designated place (CDP) in Cherokee County, Oklahoma, United States, in the Cherokee Nation. It was first listed as a CDP prior to the 2020 census.

The CDP is in southeastern Cherokee County, bordered to the north by Tenkiller, to the west by Caney Ridge, to the southwest by Dry Creek, and to the northeast by Rocky Mountain in Adair County. Oklahoma State Highway 100 passes through Barber, leading east  to Stilwell and west  to Highway 82 at Tenkiller Ferry Lake. Tahlequah is an additional  to the northwest on Highway 82.

Demographics

References 

Census-designated places in Cherokee County, Oklahoma
Census-designated places in Oklahoma